Captain America, a fictional superhero appearing in comic books and related media produced by Marvel Comics and its predecessor Timely Comics, has appeared in multiple films since the character's inception in 1944.

Republic Pictures released a fifteen-part Captain America serial film in 1944 that was the first film to feature a Marvel Comics character, though it deviated significantly from the comic book source material. Two made-for-TV films, Captain America and Captain America II: Death Too Soon, aired on the American broadcast television station CBS in 1979. A feature-length film directed by Albert Pyun was originally planned for a wide theatrical release in 1990, but received only a brief theatrical release in the United Kingdom before being released in the United States as a direct-to-video film.

Marvel began to produce films independently in 2005, launching a shared universe of superhero films referred to as the Marvel Cinematic Universe (MCU). A trilogy of Captain America films written by Christopher Markus and Stephen McFeely and starring Chris Evans as the title character were produced as part of the MCU in the 2010s: Captain America: The First Avenger (2011), Captain America: The Winter Soldier (2014), and Captain America: Civil War (2016). A fourth MCU film starring Anthony Mackie as Captain America, Captain America: New World Order, is slated for release in 2024.

While pre-MCU Captain America films often faced troubled productions or limited audiences, the MCU Captain America films have been critical and commercial successes. They have collectively grossed over $2.2 billion worldwide, with Civil War being the highest-grossing film of 2016. The Winter Soldier was nominated for Best Visual Effects at the Academy Awards in 2014.

Films

Serial film (1944) 

In 1944, Republic Pictures released a fifteen-part serial film starring Dick Purcell as Captain America. Based on the comic books published by Timely Comics – the corporate predecessor to Marvel Comics – it is the first film to feature a Marvel Comics character. The serial deviates significantly from the comic book source material: Captain America is district attorney Grant Gardner rather than U.S. Army private Steve Rogers, the superhuman enhancement origin story and Nazi villains are omitted, and the character uses a gun rather than his iconic shield. Timely had little creative involvement in the film, and objected to Republic's treatment of the character. It was re-released in 1953 under the title Return of Captain America.

CBS made-for-TV films (1979) 

In 1979, two Captain America made-for-TV films starring Reb Brown as Steve Rogers aired on the American broadcast television station CBS. The first, titled Captain America, was directed by Rod Holcomb. Set in the late 1970s, the film focuses on Rogers as he receives superhuman enhancement and becomes the costumed superhero Captain America, a moniker formerly used by his father during the Second World War. Its sequel, Captain America II: Death Too Soon, was directed by Iván Nagy and focuses on Rogers as he rescues a scientist who is forced by a terrorist (played by Christopher Lee) to create a formula that causes rapid aging. Both films were produced as part of a partnership between Marvel and CBS to adapt Marvel properties for television, which also saw the creation of The Incredible Hulk (1977–1982), The Amazing Spider-Man (1977–1979), and Dr. Strange (1978). Captain America and Death Too Soon were the final works produced by the partnership; plans to spin off the films into a Captain America ongoing television series were abandoned due to low ratings.

Captain America (1990) 

Producers Menahem Golan and Yoram Globus of The Cannon Group purchased the film rights to Captain America in 1984, and announced their plans to create a Captain America film with Michael Winner as director that same year. Production stalled due to financial troubles at Cannon; Golan left the company in 1989 and carried the rights for the character over to 21st Century Film Corporation, where he produced Captain America in 1990 with Albert Pyun as director. Starring Matt Salinger as Steve Rogers, the film follows Captain America as he faces the villainous Red Skull (Scott Paulin) during the Second World War, becomes frozen in ice, and is revived decades later to face Red Skull again. While originally planned for a wide theatrical release, Captain America received only a brief theatrical release in the United Kingdom in 1990, and was later released in the United States as a direct-to-video film in 1992.

Marvel Cinematic Universe

Captain America: The First Avenger (2011) 

Marvel began developing a Captain America film in 1997, with Mark Gordon and Gary Levinsohn as producers and Larry Wilson and Leslie Bohem as scriptwriters. Artisan Entertainment were brought on as financers in 2000, but production was stalled by a lawsuit between Marvel and Captain America co-creator Joe Simon over the ownership of Captain America copyrights that was settled in 2003. Marvel began to produce films independently in 2005, and hired screenwriter David Self in 2006 to write the screenplay for what would become Captain America: The First Avenger. Joe Johnston was brought on to direct the film in 2008, who hired Christopher Markus and Stephen McFeely to rewrite the script. Filming occurred from 2010 to 2011. Starring Chris Evans as Steve Rogers, The First Avenger focuses on Captain America as he confronts the Red Skull (Hugo Weaving) during the Second World War. The film was released in July 2011 as part of the Marvel Cinematic Universe, a shared universe of superhero films produced by Marvel.

Captain America: The Winter Soldier (2014) 

Markus and McFeely were hired to write a sequel to The First Avenger in mid-2011, which was publicly confirmed by Marvel to be in production in April 2012. George Nolfi, F. Gary Gray, and brothers Anthony and Joseph Russo were among those considered by Marvel to direct the film, with the Russo brothers ultimately signed to direct in June 2012. The plot of the film is broadly inspired by the Winter Soldier story arc in the Captain America comics written by Ed Brubaker, which sees Steve Rogers (Evans) uncover a conspiracy involving his former partner Bucky Barnes, now a brainwashed assassin known as the Winter Soldier (played by Sebastian Stan, reprising his role from The First Avenger). Filming took place in 2013 and 2014, and the film premiered in March 2014. At the 2014 Academy Awards, The Winter Soldier was nominated for Best Visual Effects.

Captain America: Civil War (2016) 

Markus and McFeely began writing a sequel to The Winter Soldier in late 2013, and the Russo brothers, Markus, McFeely, and Evans were publicly confirmed to be returning for the film in March 2014. In October 2014 it was announced that Robert Downey Jr. had been cast in the film, reprising the role of Iron Man / Tony Stark that he originated in the 2008 film Iron Man. With the announcement of Downey's casting, Marvel confirmed that the film would adapt the comic book series Civil War by Mark Millar and Steve McNiven, which sees Captain America and Iron Man lead competing factions who respectively oppose and support efforts to regulate the actions of superheroes. Filming for Civil War occurred in 2015, and the film was released in April 2016. Civil War was the highest-grossing film of 2016, grossing over $1.1billion worldwide.

Captain America: New World Order (2024) 

Civil War was Evans' final contracted standalone film as Captain America, and concluded the trilogy of Captain America films starring the actor. In 2021, Marvel released the television miniseries The Falcon and the Winter Soldier on the streaming service Disney+, which depicts the mantle of Captain America being assumed by Sam Wilson (played by Anthony Mackie), who first appeared as the Falcon in 2014's The Winter Soldier. Falcon and the Winter Soldier head writer Malcolm Spellman and series writer Dalan Musson were confirmed to be writing a fourth Captain America film starring Mackie in April 2021, which was formally announced in July 2022 as Captain America: New World Order, with Julius Onah attached as director. Filming is scheduled to begin in March 2023, and the film is slated for release in May 2024.

Other MCU films 
Captain America is portrayed by Evans in the MCU ensemble films The Avengers (2012), Avengers: Age of Ultron (2015), Avengers: Infinity War (2018), and Avengers: Endgame (2019). Evans additionally makes cameo appearances as the character in the films Thor: The Dark World (2013), Ant-Man (2015), Spider-Man: Homecoming (2017), and Captain Marvel (2019).

Personnel

Cast and characters

Crew

Home media release

Reception

Box office performance

Critical and public response

See also 
 Captain America in other media
 Fantastic Four in film
 Punisher in film
 Spider-Man in film
 3 Dev Adam ("Three Giant Men"), 1973 Turkish film featuring an unauthorized depiction of Captain America

References

Bibliography 

 
Film series introduced in 1944
Marvel Entertainment franchises